Hansueli Schmutz (born 26 July 1950) is a Swiss former equestrian. He competed in the individual eventing at the 1984 Summer Olympics.

References

External links
 

1950 births
Living people
Swiss male equestrians
Olympic equestrians of Switzerland
Equestrians at the 1984 Summer Olympics
Sportspeople from Basel-Landschaft